Urospatha is a genus of flowering plants in the family Araceae that consists of approximately 10 known species. They are found growing in South America and Central America in swamps, wet savannahs, and brackish water. The leaves of the species in this genus are upward pointing and sagittate (arrow-shaped). The inflorescences are quite unique; the spathe is mottled and elongated with a spiral twist at the end. The seeds are distributed by water and have a texture similar to cork that allows them to float. They also quickly germinate in water.

Selected species
 Urospatha angustiloba Engl. - northwestern Brazil
 Urospatha antisylleptica  R.E.Schult. - Colombia
 Urospatha caudata  (Poepp.) Schott - Peru, northwestern Brazil
 Urospatha edwallii  Engl. - southeastern Brazil
 Urospatha friedrichsthalii Schott - Costa Rica, Guatemala, Nicaragua, Panama
 Urospatha loefgreniana Engl. - central + southern Brazil
 Urospatha meyeri  Schott - Suriname
Urospatha riedeliana Schott - northeastern Brazil
 Urospatha sagittifolia (Rudge) Schott - Brazil, Paraguay, Bolivia, Peru, Ecuador, Colombia, Venezuela, the Guianas 
 Urospatha somnolenta R.E.Schult. - Colombia
 Urospatha wurdackii (G.S.Bunting) A.Hay - Colombia, Venezuela

References

Lasioideae
Araceae genera